The Long Valley is a collection of short stories written by the American author John Steinbeck. The collection was first published in 1938. It comprises 12 short stories.

The short stories were written over several years and are set in Steinbeck's birthplace, the Salinas Valley in California. They include the prize-winning tale The Murder; The Chrysanthemums; the representation of lynch mob violence in The Vigilante, inspired by the lynching of the confessed murderers of Brooke Hart; and the classic Red Pony tales. Many of the stories were published previously. The Red Pony was written in 1933 and published in Reader's Digest.

Stories
 "The Chrysanthemums" 
 "The White Quail"
 "Flight"
 "The Snake"
 "Breakfast"
 "The Raid"
 "The Harness"
 "The Vigilante"
 "Johnny Bear"
 "The Murder"
 "Saint Katy the Virgin"
 "The Red Pony"

References

Further reading

 Busch, Christopher S. "Longing for the Lost Frontier: Steinbeck's Vision of Cultural Decline in 'The White Quail' and 'The Chrysanthemums'." Steinbeck Quarterly 26.03-04 (Summer/Fall 1993): 81-90.
 Pellow, C. Kenneth. "'The Chrysanthemums' Revisited." Steinbeck Quarterly 22.01-02 (Winter/Spring 1989): 8-16.
 Renner, Stanley. "Mary Teller and Sue Bridehead: Birds of a Feather in 'The White Quail' and Jude the Obscure." Steinbeck Quarterly 18.01-02 (Winter/Spring 1985): 35-45.
 Renner, Stanley. "Sexual Idealism and Violence in 'The White Quail'." Steinbeck Quarterly 17.03-04 (Summer/Fall 1985): 76-87.
 Ware, Elaine. "Struggle for Survival: Parallel Theme and Techniques in Steinbeck's 'Flight' and Norris's 'McTeague'." Steinbeck Quarterly 21.03-04 (Summer/Fall 1988): 96-103.
 Kohzadi, Hamedreza. "The Marriage of Hysteria and Feminism in John Steinbeck's The Chrysanthemums: Elisa Allen as a Married but Virgin Feminist Homosexual Hysteric." Interdisciplinary Literary Studies 20.4 (2018): 429-469. https://www.jstor.org/stable/10.5325/intelitestud.20.4.0429

External links 
 

1938 short story collections
1938 short stories
American short story collections
History of Monterey County, California
Short story collections by John Steinbeck
Short stories set in California